Matthew Lane (born September 5, 1977) is an American middle-distance runner.  He later ran professionally for Nike.  Lane was ranked as high as second in the US at the 3000 meters by the USATF.

Lane is a graduate of the class of 1996 of Yarmouth High School in Yarmouth, Maine.  There, he not only set the state record in cross country at the Augusta course (running 15:40 for 5K). 

He appeared in the film 5000 Meters, about the 2004 Team for the Athens Olympic games, and was featured in a New York Times article.

Lane lives in Portland, Maine, with his wife, Erin Sullivan, and their daughter. Erin was an All-American at Stanford University and a twice Foot Locker Cross-Country Champion.  Erin and Matt help coach cross country and indoor track at Yarmouth High School before becoming an attorney and professor at University of New Hampshire.

References 

Interviews

 
 

Living people
1977 births
People from Yarmouth, Maine
Sportspeople from Portland, Maine
American male middle-distance runners
Stanford University alumni
Nike, Inc. people